Nonnula is a genus of puffbird in the Bucconidae family.They are commonly known as nunlets

Extant Species

It contains the following species:

 
Bird genera
Taxa named by Philip Sclater
Taxonomy articles created by Polbot